OCan is a Film Festival in Ottawa that celebrates Canadian film with screenings in November, usually held at the ByTowne Cinema every year. It is a volunteer-run, not-for-profit organization. Films are selected by a jury of volunteers composed of film fans and filmmakers.  Screening fees are paid to artists whose films are screened.  Also known as the Ottawa Canadian Film Festival, the festival was co-founded by Ottawa-based filmmakers Jith Paul, Ed Kucerak and Blair Campbell in 2015 and collects films for consideration exclusively via a platform called FilmFreeway.  The call for submissions usually opens in January.

Background 
The Ottawa Canadian Film Festival (abbreviated as OCanFilmFest) was co-founded by Ottawa-based filmmakers Jith Paul, Ed Kucerak and Blair Campbell in 2015.  The festival was an evolution of the Treepot Film Festival spearheaded by Treepot Media's Jith Paul.  The festival features Canadian independent films of all genres from filmmakers across Canada.  The Treepot Film Festival  was a series 10 curated screenings at independent cinemas and public parks in the Ottawa area between 2011 and 2014. 

OCanFilmFest collaborated with established festivals like the One World Film Festival on screenings at the National Art Gallery and St. Paul's University and partnered with the Ottawa Champions baseball team on short film screenings between innings at games from 2015 to 2017. Independent OCanFilmFest Film Festival screenings began in 2017 and the festival moved to Arts Court in Ottawa in 2018.

In addition to annual screenings, a series of streamed short film screenings 'Shorts at Home' was launched in May 2020.

In 2020, the annual festival temporarily moved online to Vimeo's On Demand Platform as a result of the ongoing COVID-19 pandemic. The annual 2021 festival, OCan21, was also held online, out of an abundance of caution due to the continuing COVID-19 pandemic.

The festival returns to in-person screenings in 2022 at the Bytowne Cinema in Ottawa.

Highlights

2017 Festival Films 
Feature Films:
 RAW* (feature film) – Ottawa Premiere - Director: David I. Strasser (Vancouver, BC)
 Broken Mile (feature film) – Ottawa Premiere - Director: Justin McConnell (Toronto, ON)
 Heroes Manufactured (feature film) – Ottawa Premiere - Director: Yaron Betan (Toronto, ON)
 Sisyphus Rides (feature film) – Ottawa Premiere - Directors: Lisa Lightbourn Lay & Tim Alberts (Limehouse, ON)
Short Films:
 Hue Quilted Windowpane – Ottawa Premiere - Director: Lasha Mowchun (Winnipeg, MB)
 Honestly Charlotte – Canadian Premiere - Director: Sarah Hedar (Vancouver, BC)
 Milo – Ottawa Premiere - Director: Jeremie Azencot (Montreal, QC)
 The Talk – World Premiere - Director: Tyler Boyco (Peterborough, ON)
 Poison in the Water – Ottawa Premiere - Director: Romeo Candido (Toronto, ON)
 Andre the Anti-Giant – Ottawa Premiere - Director: Kim Saltarski (Toronto, ON)

2018 Festival Films 
Feature Films:
 Pur Laine (feature film) - Director: Alexander Cruz (Ottawa, ON) - WORLD PREMIERE
 The True North Project (feature film) - Director: Emil Agopian (Calgary, AB)
Short Films:
 the art of the morning - Director: Nathan Hauch (Ottawa, ON)
 Harevan  - Director: Marilou Caravecchia-Pelletier (Montreal, QC) 
 Russian Gangster - Director: Maissa Houri (Ottawa, ON)
 As It Was - Director: Blake Garbe (Toronto, ON)
 It Could Be You - Director: Cody Westman (St. John’s, NL)
 Away Home - Director: Jana Stackhouse (Toronto, ON)
 Super Bingo - Director: Matthew J. Blecha (Vancouver, BC)
 What We Owe - Director: Bryce Mercier (Oakville, ON)
 Intercept - Director: Kirk Knapp (Ottawa, ON)
 End of the Night - Director: Tavit Melikian (Montreal, QC)
 Angels - Director: Taylor Olson (Halifax, NS)

2019 Festival Films 

Feature Films:
 The Mayor of Comedy: A Canadian Stand-Up Story – Director: Matt Kelly (Toronto, ON) - WORLD PREMIERE
 Nose to Tail – Director: Jesse Zigelstein (Toronto, ON)
 Trouble In The Garden – Director: Roz Owen (Toronto, ON)
Short Films:
 Baba Yaga – Directors: Nicole Sitanski and Cheryl Taam (Vancouver, BC)
 Dog Bite – Director: Luvia Petersen (Vancouver, BC)
 Fragile Dream – Director: Isabelle Hayeur (Rawdon, QC)
 Girl in the Hallway – Director: Valerie Barnhart (Ottawa, ON)
 Life Via Rail – Director: Jonny Micay (Toronto, ON)
 May Flowers – Director: Marianna Phung (Toronto, ON)
 Newborn – Director: Ray Savaya (Toronto, ON)
 The Order of Things to Come – Director: Tavit Melikian (Montreal, QC)
 Overgrowth – Director: Christian Belisle (Ottawa, ON)
 Rise n’ Shine – Director: Silver Kim (West Vancouver, BC)
 The Still Life of Annika Myers – Director: Matthew Blecha (Victoria, BC) - WINNER, Audience Favourite

2020 Shorts at Home 
In addition to annual screenings, a series of streamed short film screenings 'Shorts at Home' was launched in May 2020.  The series is intended to prepare OCanFilmFest for online and hybrid physical/virtual screenings in 2020 and beyond.

2020 Festival Films 
OCanFilmFest moved to an online event in 2020 out of an abundance of caution due to the COVID-19 pandemic.  Fans can rent specific films for 24-hour streaming periods during the three weekends starting on November 6, 2020. 

Feature Films:
 Project Cold Days (Ottawa, ON) Director: Stephen R. Coleman
 The Great Disconnect (Ottawa, ON) Director: Tamer Soliman
 The Manhattan Project (Etobicoke, ON) Director: Matthew Campanile
Short Films:
 Advances (Burlington, ON) Director: Tyler J. Seguin
 and also, for youth (Harrowsmith, ON) Director: Eamon Hillis - WINNER, Audience Favourite 
 Guardians of the Grasslands (Bashaw, AB) Directors: Sarah Wray, Ben Wilson
 I Hope They Remember My Name (Toronto, ON) Director: Patrick Weiers
 Inhale (Strathroy, ON) Director: Brian Chambers
 Miracle, Baby (Toronto, ON) Director: C. Hudson Hwang
 Not Your Average Bear (Vancouver, BC) Director: Cliff Skelton
 Saint-Tite (Montreal, QC) Directors: Florence Pelletier, Élizabeth Marcoux-Bélair
 Social Mediation (Toronto, ON) Director: Matt Pittroff
 StreetSauce! Public Art in Waterloo Region? (Kichener, ON) Directors: Paul Campsall, Tom Knowlton
 Tessellate (Vancouver, BC) Director: Rob Jacobsen
 The Date (Halifax, NS) Director: Taylor Olson
 Vessel (Toronto, ON) Director: Ethan Godel
 WESTBOUND / EASTBOUND (Etobicoke, ON) Director: Rohan Bader
 World Of The Fluffs (Vancouver, BC) Director: Chaisi Glover

2021 Festival Films 
The 2021 edition of the festival, OCan21, took place online on Vimeo's On-Demand platform.  Fans can rent specific films for 24-hour streaming periods from November 12-21, 2021. 

Feature Films:
 Blue Hour (Red Deer, AB) Director: Jesse Pickett  - WINNER, Audience Favourite 
 Company Town (Toronto, ON) Director: Peter Findlay 
 I'll See You Later (Chestermere, AB) Director: Bruce McAllister & Jesse Nakano 
 Lune (Toronto, ON) Director: Aviva Armour-Ostroff & Arturo Pérez Torres
 My Tree (Toronto, ON) Director: Jason Sherman
 Parallel Minds (Calgary, AB) Director: Benjamin Ross Hayden
 Seeking Oblivion (London, ON) Director: Brent Baird
Short Films:
 Camp Tipsy (Toronto, ON) Director: Jana Stackhouse 
 Curbside Pickup (Ottawa, ON) Director: Hingman Leung 
 The Debate (Ottawa, ON) Director: Allison Elizabeth Burns
 The Flexed Arm Hang (Winnipeg, MB) Director: Findlay Brown
 Mute (Toronto, ON) Director: Constance Hilton 
 Pinball & Perogies (Ottawa, ON) Director: Sammy J. Lewis  
 What Flowers They Bloom (Toronto, ON) Director: C Hudson Hwang

2022 Festival Films 
The 2022 edition of the festival, OCan22, took place on November 3-5 at the Bytowne Cinema in Ottawa. 

Feature Films:
 Tehranto (Toronto, ON) Director: Faran Moradi - WINNER, Audience Favourite  
 the smallest steps (Ottawa, ON) Director: Nicole Bedford
Short Films:
 Baduk (Halifax, NS) Director: Induk Lee
 L'Entente Cordiale / The Cordial Agreement (Montreal, QC) Directors: Gautier Piton, Clement Douillet
 Magic Trick (Vancouver, BC) Director: Chris Lennox-Aasen
 Plus que des cheveux / More Than Hair (Ottawa, ON) Director: Fitch Jean
 Sarah (Hamilton, ON) Director: Peter Riddihough
 Tears of Oizys (Ottawa, ON) Director: Ramy Raphae
 The High Road (Yellowknife, NT) Director: Keith Robertson
 The Star Mill (Oakville, ON) Director: Daniel Blake
 The Untouchable (Toronto, ON) Director: Aazeh Shahnavaz

References

External links 
 Ottawa Canadian Film Festival
 Ottawa Canadian Film Festival on Facebook
 Ottawa Canadian Film Festival on Instagram
 Ottawa Canadian Film Festival on IMDb

Film festivals in Ottawa
Film festivals established in 2015
2015 establishments in Ontario
Ottawa
Organizations based in Ottawa
Festivals in Ottawa
Events in Ottawa